John Henry Lanchester (born 25 February 1962) is a British journalist and novelist. 

He was born in Hamburg, brought up in Hong Kong and educated in England; between 1972 and 1980 at Gresham's School in Holt, Norfolk, then at St John's College, Oxford. 

He is married to historian and author Miranda Carter, with whom he has two children, and lives in London.

Works
Lanchester is the author of novels, a memoir, non-fiction and journalism.

His journalism has appeared in the London Review of Books (where he is a Contributing Editor), Granta, The Observer, The New York Review of Books, The Guardian, the Daily Telegraph and The New Yorker. He also regularly writes on food and technology for Esquire.

The Debt to Pleasure (1996) won the 1996 Whitbread Book Award in the First Novel category and the 1997 Hawthornden Prize. It was described as a skilful and wickedly funny account of the life of a loquacious Englishman named Tarquin Winot, revealed through his thoughts on cuisine as he undertakes a mysterious journey around France. The revelations become more and more shocking as the truth about the narrator becomes apparent. He is a monster, and yet an appealing and erudite villain.

Mr Phillips (2000) describes one day in the life of Victor Phillips, a middle-aged accountant who has been made redundant, but has yet to tell his family. He spends the day travelling round London, with the narrative dividing itself between reporting Mr Phillips' observations about what he sees, and also exploring his recollections of things in the past, or his own taboo-like preoccupations, with sex and social obligation. The book deals with other male, middle-class concerns, including money, family and getting older.

Fragrant Harbour (2002) is set in Hong Kong in the 1980s. It tells the stories of three immigrants to the island—an ambitious and increasingly self-confident female English journalist who has recently arrived, an elderly English hotel-keeper who came in the 1930s; a young Chinese man who came as a child refugee from mainland China.

His memoir Family Romance (2007) recounts the story of his mother, a nun who walked out of the convent, changed her name, falsified her age, and concealed these facts from her husband and son until her death.

2010 saw the publication of Lanchester's book Whoops! Why Everyone Owes Everyone and No One Can Pay (titled I.O.U.: Why Everyone Owes Everyone and No One Can Pay outside the UK). It is an explanation of the 2007–2010 financial crisis for general readers.

In 2012 he published the novel Capital, which was later adapted into a three-part TV series for BBC 1, first broadcast on 24 November 2015. In 2013 he was invited by The Guardian to examine materials from Edward Snowden, and on 4 October wrote "The Snowden files: why the British public should be worried about GCHQ".

Lanchester wrote the introduction to a 2012 edition of Empire of the Sun by J. G. Ballard, an author he resonates with.

Lanchester's 2019 novel  The Wall is among the thirteen works named to the Booker Prize longlist for the year 2019.

Bibliography

Books

Fiction

Non-fiction

Essays and reporting
 
 
 
 
"The robots are coming". London Review of Books. 37 (5): 3–8. 5 March 2015. Retrieved 4 November 2017.
 
 
 
  (Universal Basic Income)
  (aspects of Cyber sovereignty and mass surveillance in China such as the fifty-cent army, Great Firewall)

References

External links

Links to articles available online by John Lanchester in the London Review of Books.
Whoops Video presentation on YouTube
Interview with John Lanchester on "money, markets, and morals", conducted by Henk de Berg.

1962 births
Living people
21st-century English novelists
English people of Irish descent
English male journalists
People educated at Gresham's School
Alumni of St John's College, Oxford
Fellows of the Royal Society of Literature
English male novelists
The New Yorker people
21st-century English male writers